In Indian philosophy and religions,  is "knowledge".

The idea of jñāna centers on a cognitive event which is recognized when experienced. It is knowledge inseparable from the total experience of reality, especially a total or divine reality (Brahman). 

The root ज्ञा- jñā- is cognate to  English know, as well as to the Greek γνώ- (as in γνῶσις gnosis) and Lithuanian žinoti. Its antonym is अज्ञान ajñāna "ignorance".

In Buddhism

In Tibetan Buddhism, jñāna (Tibetan: ye shes) refers to pure awareness that is free of conceptual encumbrances, and is contrasted with vijñana, which is a moment of 'divided knowing'. Entrance to, and progression through the ten stages of jñana (Bodhisattva bhumis), will lead one to complete enlightenment and nirvana.

In Theravada Buddhism there are various vipassana-ñanas or "insight knowledges" on the path of insight into the true nature of reality. As a person meditates these ñanas or "knowledges" will be experienced in order. The experience of each may be brief or may last for years and the subjective intensity of each is variable. Each ñana could also be considered a jhāna although many are not stable and the mind has no way to remain embedded in the experience. Experiencing all the ñanas will lead to the first of the Four stages of enlightenment then the cycle will start over at a subtler level.

In Hinduism

Vedanta
Prajñānam Brahma (प्रज्ञानम् ब्रह्म), one of the Mahāvākyas, roughly means "Insight is Brahman" or "Brahman is Insight".

Yoga
Jñāna yoga (ज्ञानयोग, lit. Yoga of Knowledge) is one of the three main paths (मार्ग, margas), which are supposed to lead towards moksha (मोक्ष, liberation) from material miseries. The other two main paths are Karma yoga and Bhakti yoga. Rāja yoga (राजयोग, classical yoga) which includes several yogas, is also said to lead to moksha. It is said that each path is meant for a different temperament of personality.

In Jainism 

According to the Jain texts like Tattvārthsūtra and Sarvārthasiddhi, knowledge is of five kinds :
 Mati Jñāna (Sensory Knowledge)
 Śruta Jñāna (Scriptural Knowledge)
 Avadhi Jñāna (Clairvoyance)
 Manah prayāya Jñāna (Telepathy)
 Kevala Jnana (Omniscience)

In Sikhism 
Gyan or Gian refers to spiritual knowledge. Learned people are often referred to as "Giani". It is mentioned throughout the Guru Granth Sahib.

See also 

 Advaita Vedanta
 Enlightenment (spiritual)
 Mahāvākyas
 Nondualism
 Mysticism
 Vidya (philosophy)
 Vipassanā-ñāṇa

Notes

References

Sources

 Anna Dallapiccola, Dictionary of Hindu Lore and Legend

External links
 Jnana definition and other relevant text
 What Is Jnana? (Jiva Institute)

Hindu philosophical concepts
Knowledge
Spiritual faculties
Metaphilosophy
Vedanta
Yoga concepts
Buddhist philosophical concepts
Sanskrit words and phrases